The first names, or glossonyms, of the Catalan/Valencian language formed in a dialectal relation with Latin, in which Catalan existed as a variety. These names already expressed the relationship between the two languages (Council of Tours 813). New names that related Catalan to Rome (lingua romanana, romançar or romanç) came about to dignify the Catalan language in the thirteenth century, though Latinists called it vulgar (or sermo vulgaris) and the people planus, or pla.

During the Muslim presence in Iberia and the Reconquista, it was known as chrestianesch ('Christianish'), or lingua chrestianica, or christianica ('Christian language'), and contrasted with Classical languages, like Arabic and Hebrew; that are linked to Islamic and Judaic traditions. With the language expanding beyond Catalonia, names that indicated its place of origin were favoured: catalanesch (or cathalanesch), valencianesch and balearica or maioricensis. Likewise, the monarchy became associated with the language, which neutralized the political divisions of its territory.  The increased range of the language had the effect of unifying the territory that it came to be spoken in, a fact that successive rulers took advantage of to neutralize political divisions, as was recorded by Ramon Muntaner. The first written reference to Catalan appears in the regles de trobar (Rules of the Trobadour's Art, ca. 1290), written in Occitan in Sicily by the Catalan troubadour and monk Jofre of Foixà: "si tu trobes en cantar proençals alcun mot que i sia frances o catalanesch..." (If you find a French or Catalan word in a troubadour song...) By the end of Middle Ages, Latin was less of a universal language, provoking Catalan to receive other names that remarked a local character and the political divisions of the time: materna lingua (or maternus sermo), maioricensis (in the Kingdom of Majorca), valencianesch (in the Kingdom of Valencia). Similarly, when Castile and Aragon were united in the fifteenth century, the range of the Catalan name was reduced to simply mean "from Catalonia" and confusion about the origin of the language led to the apparition of names such as lemosin, or llemosí (Limousin).  Before the Renaixença, which revitalized Catalan-language culture, some unpopular terms such as llemosí-català, català i valencià, and bacavès (after balear-català-valencià) were created.

See also
 Valencian language controversy

External links
 Zarko Muljačić, "Perché i glottonimi linguaggio italiano, lingua italiana (e sim.) appaiono per indicare «oggetti» reali e non soltanto auspicati moho piú tardi di altri termini analoghi che si riferiscono a vane lingue gallo e ibero-romanze?"
Sobre la llengua dels valencians. informes i documents, Universitat de Valencia, Valènciam, 1998
Llengua i cultura dels Borja a Roma. Els "catalani"
A.Vila Francés i A. Vila Moreno, El nom històric de la llengua valenciana
August Rafanell, El misteriós llemosí de la festa d'Elx: constants d'un discurs perifèric 
 Josep Ballester, El feixisme i la cultura catalana al País Valencià a la postguerra: a propòsit d'un procés de folclorització i d'eliminació 
Joan Fuster, Qüestió de noms
Documental "Del roig al blau"
 Dictamen de l'Acadèmia Valenciana de la Llengua sobre els principis i criteris per a la defensa de la denominació i l'entitat del valencià
 Organització pel Multilingüisme. Nosaltres que podem, dialoguem.
Buidatge d’articles de l’Estat de la qüestió : La polèmica català/valencià

Further reading

 Antoni I. Alomar, «La llengua catalana com a patrimoni de les Balears des del punt de vista del passat», dins Societat Arqueològica Lul·liana, Actes del IV Congrés El nostre patrimoni cultural: El català, patrimoni de Mallorca, Palma, 1997, pàgs. 17-56.
 Josep Amengual i Batle, "La llengua del poble dins els sínodes mallorquins", Randa 6.
 Germà Colón i Domènech, La llengua catalana en els seus textos I, Curial Ed., Barcelona, 1978. p. 39-59, 60-71. .
 Germà Colón i Domènech, El español y el catalán, juntos y en contraste, Editorial Ariel, Barcelona, 1989, p. 19-32. .
 Germà Colón i Domènech, Estudis de filologia catalana i romànica, Institut Interuniversiari de Filologia Valenciana - Publicacions de l'Abadia de Montserrat, València/Barcelona, 1997, p. 185-194. .
 Germà Colón i Domènech, De Ramon Llull al Diccionari de Fabra. Acostament a les lletres catalanes, Fundació Germà Colón, Publicacions de l'Abadia de Montserrat, Barcelona, 2003, p. 229-242. .
 Antoni Ferrando,  Consciència idiomàtica i nacional dels valencians, València, Universitat de València, València, 1980. 
 Antoni Ferrando i Miquel Nicolás, Panorama d'història de la llengua, Tàndem Edicions, València, 1993. .
 Antoni Ferrando i Miquel Nicolás, Història de la llengua catalana, Universitat Oberta,Ed. Pòrtic, Barcelona, 2005, p. 105-107, 165-169, 251.254. .
 Rosalia Guilleumas, La llengua catalana segons Antoni Rubió i Lluch, Ed. Barcino, Barcelona, 1957. .
 Antoni Mas i Forners, «De nationes seu linguae a cuius regio eius lingua. Les demominacions gentilícies de la llengua a Mallorca durant l’edat mitjana», Homenatge a Guillem Rosselló Bordoy, Volum II, Palma, 2002. p. 585-606. .
 Josep Massot i Muntaner, «La consciència lingüística als segles XV-XVIII», Lluc, desembre de 1969, pàgs. 6-8; recollit dins Els mallorquins i la llengua autòctona, Curial, Barcelona, 11972, pàgs. 13-25.
 Josep Massot i Muntaner, "Antoni M. Alcover i la llengua catalana", II Congrés Internacional de la Llengua Catalana, Publicacions de l'Abadia de Montserrat, Barcelona, 1985, p. 118-127.
 Manuel Sanchis Guarner, "La llengua dels valencians", Ed. Tres i Quatre, València, 1972. p. 2144.
 Pere Oliver i Domenge, La catalanitat de les Mallorques. Conferència llegida en la vetlla del 23 de març de 1916, en el Casal Catalanista de Sants «Els Segadors»,  Esquerra Republicana de Catalunya – Illes Balears i Pitiüses,  Mallorca, 1993.
 Antonio Planas Rosselló, El proceso penal en el Reino de Mallorca, Miquel Font Ed., Palma, 1998. .
 August Rafanell (ed.), Un nom per a la llengua. El concepte de llemosí en la història del català, Vic/Girona, EUMO Editorial/Universitat de Girona, 1991. .
 August Rafanell Vall-llosera, El llemosinisme. Un estudi de les idees sobre la variació lingüística en la història de la llengua catalana, Publicacions de la Universitat Autònoma de Barcelona, Tesi Doctoral (microfitxa), Bellaterra: UAB, 1991.
 Mila Segarra, "Llengua i escriptura en la societat catalana medieval" dins Història de la cultura catalana I, Ed. 62, Barcelona, 1999,  p. 125-150. .
 Sobre la llengua els valencians. informes i documents, Universitat de Valencia, València, 1998.

Catalan language